The teams competing in Group 5 of the 2004 UEFA European Under-21 Championships qualifying competition were Germany, Scotland, Iceland and Lithuania.

Standings

Matches
All times are CET.

Goalscorers
3 goals

 Edgaras Česnauskis
 Aurimas Kučys

2 goals

 Benjamin Auer
 Mike Hanke
 Benjamin Lauth
 Stephen Hughes
 Kevin Kyle
 Simon Lynch
 Shaun Maloney

1 goal

 Hanno Balitsch
 Jermaine Jones
 Michael Zepek
 Sigmundur Kristjansson
 Hannes Sigurðsson
 Mindaugas Kalonas
 Andrius Petreikis
 Marius Stankevičius
 Gary Caldwell
 Steven Hammell

2 own goals
 Gerdas Aleksa (playing against Germany)

1 own goal
 Hjalmur Hjalmsson (playing against Lithuania)

External links
 Group 5 at UEFA.com

Group 5
Under
Under